Jason Stoltenberg defeated Jonas Björkman 6–0, 2–6, 7–5 to win the 1997 International Tennis Championships singles event. Stoltenberg was the defending champion.

Seeds

  Jonas Björkman (final)
  Petr Korda (second round, retired)
  Alex O'Brien (first round)
  Jason Stoltenberg (champion)
  Byron Black (second round)
  Nicklas Kulti (first round)
  Sandon Stolle (second round)
  Gilbert Schaller (first round)

Draw

Finals

Top half

Bottom half

External links
 1997 International Tennis Championships draw

Singles
Delray Beach Open